Emika is an English singer from Milton Keynes.

Emika may also refer to:

Emika, Arizona
Emika (album)

People with the given name
, member of Japanese idol group NMB48
, Japanese javelin thrower

Japanese feminine given names